Sabrina Javaid is a Pakistani politician. She had been a member of the Provincial Assembly of the Punjab from August 2018 till  January 2023.

Career 
She joined Tehreek e Insaf (PTI) in 2004 as earlier she started her political carrier from grass root  beimg  student  of Masters in Political Science and played a Pivotal role in representing Women in Jhelum District . She was elected as President Women Wing of Jhelum District on 23 March 2013 in Intra Party Elections of Pakistan e Insaaf. She is a member of the Planning & Development Standing Committee, the Higher Education Standing Committee and the Environmental & Protection Standing Committee of the Provincial Assembly of The Punjab. She is on the Board of HITEC University Taxila.She was a designated to be part of Pakistan Parlimentarians Delegation on the Role of Parlimentarians in Development held at Kampala,Uganda in March 2021.She has widely travelled abroad ,I.e; UAE, UK,Saudi Arabia, Bangkok,Singapore,Australia,Uganda.

Since August 2018 she has endeavored to Unify the PTI District Jhelum Chapter, thus enabling it to play a major role in the Development of Jhelum District as per the Vision of Imran Khan, Chairman Pakistan Tehreek-e-insaf,Prime Minister of Islamic Republic of Pakistan.

She brought  Chinese Private  Investment of US$5 Billion for Clean  Drinking Water and Sanitation and Metering for Government of Punjab, covering entire of Punjab ,which starts from  Lahore in June 2023 or before, of which Agreement was formally signed between WASA Punjab and the Chinese Private Investors at Lahore , Pakistan on 14 March 2022, in her presence and presence  of Mr Usman Buzdar, Chief Minister of Punjab,Pakistan and Financial Closure of the Project was done on 30 November 2022 in presence of Mr Perveez Elahi, Chief Minister Punjab, Pakistan, as per Vision of Mr Imran Khan, Prime Minister of Islamic of Pakistan and Chairman Pakistan Tehreek-e-insaf, as finally approved by him on 31 December 2021,being the only major Investment in History of Punjab in 75 years, thus becoming a Pioneer Parlimentarian to serve the interest of Punjab,Pakistan in field of Human Development.

She was elected to the Provincial Assembly of the Punjab as a candidate of Pakistan Tehreek-e-Insaf (PTI) on a reserved seat for women in 2018 Pakistani general election.

Family 
She is the wife of Major (Retired) Javaid Inayat Khan Kayani, the daughter of Late Colonel Abdul Aziz , and the eldest daughter-in-law of Late Colonel Muhammad Inayat Khan Kayani of PINDGOLANDAZAN Tehsil Sohawa, District Jhelum,Pakistan. The later was and still well known as  a philanthropist and Voluntary social worker in Jhelum District. Her maternal grandfather, Maulvi Muhammad Hussain , was a member of the Azad Kashmir first Legislative Assembly soon after the independence of Pakistan and was Finance Minister in the first Cabinet of Azad Kashmir.

She has 3 sons; one is in active service as a Lieutenant Colonel in the Pakistan Army and  2 are professionals in their fields.

References

Living people
Punjabi people
Punjab MPAs 2018–2023
Pakistan Tehreek-e-Insaf MPAs (Punjab)
Women members of the Provincial Assembly of the Punjab
Year of birth missing (living people)
21st-century Pakistani women politicians